Yehor Oleksandrovych Kartushov (born 5 January 1991) is a Ukrainian footballer who plays for Metalist Kharkiv.

Career

FC Desna Chernihiv 
In 2012, he moved to FC Desna Chernihiv and in the 2012–13 season with Desna won the Second League title and rose in the class. Following the results of the championship of 2013-14 the team took the 5th position in the Ukrainian First League.

In the Ukrainian Cup in the season 2013–14, with Desna he reached the quarter finals and according to the results of the 2017–18 season with his club, won the bronze medals of the First League and gained the right to compete in the Premier League through the play-offs against Zirka Kropyvnytskyi.

Yehor Kartushov with his team got into the Quarterfinals of the Ukrainian Cup in the season 2017–18 against Dynamo Kyiv and in the same season he has been elected best player of the Round 6. Two seasons later in the season 2019–20, he got again into the Quarterfinals of the Ukrainian Cup for the second time of the history of the club.

In February 2019, he signed a new contract with Desna Chernihiv In Premier League in the season 2019–20, with Desna, he got the 4th place, through the play-offs for the Championship round table. Always in the season 2019–20, contributing to achieve the 4th place in the Premier League and qualifying for the play-offs for the Championship round table and also into the Quarterfinals of the Ukrainian Cup in season 2019–20.

The 30 May 2020 he scored during the play-offs against FC Kolos Kovalivka, allow FC Desna Chernihiv to win 0–2 away. On 28 June 2020 he scored against Dynamo Kyiv, where Desna won 3–2 in a fantastic game.

With the club of Chernihiv qualified for the first time in the history of the club for the Europa League third qualifying round. and been the second top assist in the League, together with Vladyslav Kocherhin and Júnior Moraes

He played in UEFA Europa League, in the team Desna Chernihiv against VfL Wolfsburg for the Europa League third qualifying round at the AOK Stadion.

On 13 December 2020, he scored a goal on the 2–0 victory against FC Mariupol in Kyiv at the NSC Olimpiyskiy thus celebrated the 100th match in the UPL. On 19 January 2021 he scored his first goal with the new team in the victory for 4–2 against Dinaz Vyshhorod in a friendly game. On 4 February 2021, he scored against Ahrobiznes in the friendly match ended 4-0 for Desna.

On 8 March 2021 he scored in Ukrainian Premier League in the season 2020–21 against Rukh Lviv at the Skif Stadium for away victory for 0–4.

On 1 May 2021 he scored against Kolos Kovalivka at the Chernihiv Stadium giving the 2-2 for the club of Chernihiv. On 11 July 2021 he extended his contract with the club for one more year and he has nominated captain of the team of Chernihiv. On 21 September 2021 he played against Metalist Kharkiv in Ukrainian Cup in the season 2021-22. On 11 February 2022 he was included in the team for the preparation in Turkey for the second half of the season. On 11 February 2022 he played in the match against Velež Mostar and on 17 February he played against Torpedo Kutaisi in two  friendly match.

Metalist Kharkiv
On 18 February 2022, Kartushov after 10 years with the club of Chernihiv, he signed a 2.5-year contract with Metalist Kharkiv. On 25 June 2022 he played the first friendly match with the new club against Botev Plovdiv. On 1 July he played against İstanbul Başakşehir in a friendly match. On 7 July 2022 Kartushov, together with coach Oleksandr Kucher, left Metalist Kharkiv and joined the Dnipro-1 training camp and on the 8 July he played in the friendly match against NK Čarda. On the 14 July 2022 he played in the friendly match against Aris Limassol.

International career
He was also a member of the Ukraine national under-21 football team.

Outside of professional football
In March 2022, during the Siege of Chernihiv, Kartushov, together with other Desna's ex-players like Andriy Totovytskyi, Yevhen Selin, Vladyslav Kalitvintsev, Pylyp Budkivskyi, Ihor Lytovka, Andriy Dombrovskyi, Oleksandr Filippov, Levan Arveladze, Artem Favorov and   Denys Favorov, transferred money for the civilian population of the city of Chernihiv.

Career statistics

Club

Honours
FC Desna Chernihiv
 Ukrainian First League: 2017–18
 Ukrainian Second League: 2012–13

Shakhtar-3 Donetsk
 Ukrainian Premier League youth championship: 2008–09

Individual
 Desna Chernihiv Player of the Year: 2015
 Top Assist Ukrainian Premier League: Runner-up 2019-20 (8 Assists)
 Best Player of round 6 Ukrainian First League:2017–18 with FC Desna Chernihiv

References

External links
 Profile on Official website of FC Desna Chernihiv
 
 
 

1991 births
Living people
People from Saky
Ukrainian footballers
Association football forwards
FC Shakhtar-3 Donetsk players
FC Zorya Luhansk players
FC Mariupol players
FC Desna Chernihiv players
FC Desna Chernihiv captains
FC Metalist Kharkiv players
Ukrainian Premier League players
Ukrainian First League players
Ukrainian Second League players
Ukraine under-21 international footballers
Ukraine youth international footballers